William Henry Arnold or Richard William Arnold (December 16, 1905 – November 10, 1976) was an American racecar driver.  He won the 1930 Indianapolis 500.

Early life and career
Billy Arnold was born in Chicago on December 16, 1905.  He earned his B.S. degree in mechanical engineering from the University of Illinois at Urbana–Champaign and after his racing days were over, pursued a Ph.D. from the MIAT College of Technology.

Arnold won the 1930 Indianapolis 500 after leading all but first two laps of the race, the most ever by a winner of the race and he won by a margin of 7 minutes and 17 seconds.  He was 24 years old at the time.  In 1931 he led 155 laps but crashed on lap 162 while holding a five-lap lead, suffering serious injuries along with his riding mechanic Spider Matlock.  A tire came off the car, bounced over the stands and killed 11-year-old Wilbur Brink, who was playing in his yard outside the track.  In 1932 Arnold led 57 laps before crashing on lap 59.  He suffered a broken shoulder and riding mechanic Matlock suffered a broken pelvis.  At the urging of his wife, Arnold retired from racing.

At the time of his death he was married to LaFrance Arnold, his second wife.  Prior to his affair, in May 1932, he was married to Dorothy Canfield of Detroit.

During World War II, he served with Gen. Dwight D. Eisenhower as Chief of Maintenance for the U.S. 8th Air Force and left the service in 1945 as a LtCol.

Following the war, Arnold worked at Fretwell's DeSoto then entered the construction business, building upscale houses and one of the first shopping centers in Oklahoma.  Between 1950 and 1958, he developed water skis and was among the pioneers of the sport.  His AquaKing water skis became the official water ski of Cypress Gardens in Florida.

Arnold died November 10, 1976, in Oklahoma City, of a cerebral hemorrhage, aged 70.  He is buried at Resurrection Memorial Cemetery in Oklahoma City.

Indianapolis 500 results

References

External links
 The Greatest 33 Profile

1905 births
1976 deaths
Grainger College of Engineering alumni
Racing drivers from Chicago
Champ Car champions
Indianapolis 500 drivers
Indianapolis 500 polesitters
Indianapolis 500 winners
AAA Championship Car drivers
Military personnel from Chicago
United States Army Air Forces colonels
Burials in Oklahoma